DNF may refer to:

Computing and logic
 Dutch national flag problem, a computer science–related programming problem proposed by Edsger Dijkstra
 DNF (software), a package manager for RPM-based Linux distributions
 Disjunctive normal form, a standardization of a logical formula in boolean logic

Other uses
 Dungeon & Fighter, a video game series created by Neople
 Did not finish, a designation given in a race indicating that the competitor did not finish
 Duke Nukem Forever, a 2011 first-person shooter video game

See also
 Do not Fragment (DF), a flag bit in IPv4 packets